Red Love is a 1925 American silent Western film directed by Edgar Lewis and starring John Lowell, Evangeline Russell, and Ann Brody.

Plot
As described in a film magazine review, Thunder Cloud, an educated Sioux young man, provokes the enmity of Bill Mosher, a vicious white man. He whips the man because an insult. When he believes he has killed the man, he flees to other parts. After a romance with Starlight, an Indian maid, he finally surrenders. In the courtroom, his honor is vindicated.

Cast

References

Bibliography
 Connelly, Robert B. The Silents: Silent Feature Films, 1910-36, Volume 40, Issue 2. December Press, 1998.
 Hearne, Joanna. Native Recognition: Indigenous Cinema and the Western. SUNY Press, 2013.

External links

 
 

1925 films
1925 Western (genre) films
American black-and-white films
Films directed by Edgar Lewis
Silent American Western (genre) films
1920s English-language films
1920s American films